Vera Vladimirovna Bryndzei (born 25 January 1952 in Ivano-Frankivsk, Ukrainian SSR) is a former speed skater who competed for the Soviet Union.

Skating for Dynamo Kiev, Vera Bryndzei won a silver medal at the Soviet Sprint Championships in 1975. She would eventually win two more national medals, both at the Soviet Allround Championships: silver in 1977 and bronze in 1978.

Bryndzei made her first international appearance in 1976 at the World Allround Championships in Gjøvik where she finished 16th. Her only international success came the next year when Bryndzei became the 1977 World Allround Champion in Keystone. She also participated in the World Sprint Championships two weeks later, finishing 23rd. In 1978, Bryndzei did not successfully defend her World Champion title, finishing in a disappointing 14th place. At the 1980 Winter Olympics of Lake Placid, she competed in the 1,500 m, resulting in an 18th place.

Personal records
To put these personal records in perspective, the WR column lists the official world records on the dates that Bryndzei skated her personal records.

Note that the 5,000 m was suspended as a world record event at the 1955 ISU (International Skating Union) Congress and was reinstated at the 1982 ISU Congress.

Bryndzei has an Adelskalender score of 181.847 points.

References 
 Vera Bryndzei at SkateResults.com
 Personal records from Jakub Majerski's Speedskating Database
 Evert Stenlund's Adelskalender pages
 Results of Championships of Russia and the USSR from SpeedSkating.ru
 Historical World Records. International Skating Union.

External links 
 

1952 births
Living people
Sportspeople from Ivano-Frankivsk
Ukrainian female speed skaters
Soviet female speed skaters
Olympic speed skaters of the Soviet Union
Speed skaters at the 1980 Winter Olympics
Honoured Masters of Sport of the USSR
World Allround Speed Skating Championships medalists